Vas Lane is situated in the heart of the city of Mangalore, Karnataka, India. It is considered one of the most preferred residential locations of Mangalore.

Location 
Vas Lane is situated adjacent to Balmatta-Bendoorwell Road, and it extends all the way up to Unity Hospital in Falnir. It is well connected by city buses i.e. all the buses plying towards Kankanady stop at Vaslane. The nearest market is the Kankanady Market.

Vas Lane also lends its name to the two most famous bakeries in Mangalore called Vas Bakery. One is located in Balmatta and the other one near Bendoorwell, opposite to St Agnes College. The bread made by Vas Bakery is of homemade style, and it very popular among local residents. Vas Bakery is also popular for its sweet bun.

References 

Localities in Mangalore